The Capitol Police Board is the body that governs the United States Capitol Police. It was established in 1873, and today consists of three voting members: the Sergeant at Arms of the United States House of Representatives, the Sergeant at Arms of the United States Senate, and the Architect of the Capitol. Additionally, the chief of the Capitol Police serves ex officio as a non-voting member. The chairmanship of the board alternates annually between the House and Senate Sergeants at Arms.

The board, like Congress, is not subject to freedom of information laws, and the Inspector General of the board does not publish their findings and reports to the board who retains their employment.

References

External links
 
 GAO Report to Congressional Requesters, 2017
 C-Span House Administration Committee hearing

United States Capitol Police